The South African Railways Class 2  of 1905 was a steam locomotive from the pre-Union era in the Colony of Natal.

In 1905, the Natal Government Railways placed two Class A steam locomotives with a  Pacific type wheel arrangement in service. In 1912, when these locomotives were assimilated into the South African Railways, they were renumbered and designated Class 2.

Manufacturer
In 1904, orders were placed with the North British Locomotive Company (NBL) for two  Pacific type locomotives for the Natal Government Railways (NGR). They were designed by NGR Locomotive Superintendent D.A. Hendrie for passenger traffic on those sections of the mainline between Ladysmith and Charlestown which did not have very severe gradients. When they were delivered and placed in service early in 1905, they were designated the NGR Class A, also commonly known as the Hendrie A, and numbered 325 and 326.

Characteristics
The boiler of this Class was noted for its free steaming qualities. The engines used saturated steam, had Stephenson valve gear and were built on plate frames. The cylinders were inclined 1 in 18 and were arranged outside the plate frames, while the balanced slide valves were arranged inside the frames. After these two engines, Hendrie adopted Walschaerts valve gear and outside valves on all his subsequent locomotive designs for its greater accessibility.

The locomotives had Belpaire fireboxes with firebar rocking finger grates.

With a bridle casting, the widening of the locomotive frame at the back end was accomplished by uniting the narrow front part of the frame and the wider rear part by the heavy steel casting. This method of widening the frames for the firebox continued on the SAR until the general adoption of bar frames for mainline locomotives by 1927 rendered it no longer necessary.

Service

Natal Government Railways
The two locomotives ran their first trials on 31 January and 3 March 1905 respectively. As intended, they were placed in service between Ladysmith and Charlestown and were shedded at Charlestown. They worked the mail trains on this section for many years.

South African Railways
When the Union of South Africa was established on 31 May 1910, the three Colonial government railways (CGR, NGR and Central South African Railways) were united under a single administration to control and administer the railways, ports and harbours of the Union. Although the South African Railways and Harbours came into existence in 1910, the actual classification and renumbering of all the rolling stock of the three constituent railways were only implemented with effect from 1 January 1912.

In 1912, these two Pacifics were renumbered 762 and 763 and designated  on the SAR.

They were later transferred to the Witwatersrand for a short period, after which they worked on the Komatipoort-Waterval Boven section until they were withdrawn by 1936.

References

1210
1210
4-6-2 locomotives
2′C1′ n2 locomotives
NBL locomotives
Cape gauge railway locomotives
Railway locomotives introduced in 1905
1905 in South Africa
Scrapped locomotives